Events of 2021 in England

Incumbent

Events 

COVID-19 in England: Most of England's primary schools reopen after the Christmas break, amid concerns over whether pupils should be returning during the current level of COVID-19 infections. However, this decision is reversed by the following day.
3 March – Sarah Everard disappeared and was found dead a week later.
6 May – 
A series of elections are due to take place for local councils and directly elected mayors in England, police and crime commissioners in England and Wales
London Assembly election
London mayoral election
21 May – Plastic bag charge rises to 10p per bag and extends to all shops.
11 June – 11 July – UEFA Euro 2020 begins, with England hosting and participating in Group D at Wembley Stadium, London. They advance to the final where they draw 1-1 with Italy and lose 3-2 after a penalty shoot-out.
28 June – Elephant & Castle fire
15 July – Bowburn crash
26 July – Marble Arch Mound
12 August – Plymouth shooting
17 September - Murder of Sabina Nessa
15 October - Murder of David Amess
31 October - 2021 Salisbury rail crash
14 November - Liverpool Women's Hospital bombing
25 November - Murder of Ava White

Scheduled and predicted events 
Unknown date – 
The construction of the United Kingdom's largest solar farm in the village of Graveney, Kent will begin in spring 2021 which was given the go-ahead by Business secretary Alok Sharma in May 2020.

Births
 9 February – August Brooksbank, son of Princess Eugenie and Jack Brooksbank

Deaths
 5 January – Colin Bell, footballer (England, Bury, Manchester City) (b. 1946)
 10 January – Mark Keds, punk musician (b. 1970)
 16 January – Charlotte Cornwell, actress (b. 1949)
 20 January – John Russell, musician (b. 1954)
 2 February – Peter Dunn, paediatrician (b. 1929)
 13 March – Murray Walker, motorsport commentator and journalist (b. 1923)
 31 March – Jane Manning, soprano (b. 1938)
 30 April – Anthony Payne, composer (b. 1936)
 23 June – Jackie Lane, actress (Doctor Who, Compact) (b. 1941)
 25 June – Brian Bamford, professional golfer (b. 1935)
 9 July – Joan Le Mesurier, actress and writer (b. 1931)
 10 July – Carmel Budiardjo, human rights activist, founder of Tapol, and author (b. 1925)
 15 July – Andy Fordham, darts player, world champion (2004), organ failure (b. 1962)
 17 July – Graham Vick,  opera director, COVID-19 (b. 1953)
 18 July – Tom O'Connor, comedian and game show host (Crosswits, The Zodiac Game, Name That Tune), complications from Parkinson's disease (b. 1939)
 31 July – Terry Cooper, footballer (Leeds United, national team) and manager (Bristol City) (b. 1944)
 1 August – Ian Thomson, cricketer (national team) (b. 1929)
 2 August – Ged Dunn, rugby league footballer (Hull Kingston Rovers, national team) (b. 1946)
 15 October - David Amess, MP for Southend West (b. 1952)

See also 

2021 in Northern Ireland
2021 in Scotland
2021 in Wales
Politics of England

References 

 
2021 in the United Kingdom
2020s in England
Years of the 21st century in England